Lars Frykberg (born 3 January 1957) is a Swedish former cross-country skier. He won Vasaloppet in 1982, while competing for IFK Mora. in a competition where Jean-Paul Pierrat from France first reached the finish, but was disqualified for changing skis (which was not allowed).

He also won Worldloppet in the seasons of 1981/1982 and 1982/1983.

References 

1957 births
Living people
Swedish male cross-country skiers
Vasaloppet winners
IFK Mora skiers